Roger A. Hughes (born September 4, 1960) is an American football coach and former player.  He served as the head coach at Princeton University from 2000 to 2009, and amassed a 47–52 record.  He was the head coach at Stetson University, which revived their program after a hiatus of more than 50 years beginning with the 2013 season. On May 7, 2021, Hughes resigned to become the president of Doane University.

Biography
Hughes grew up in Crawford, Nebraska and was a three-sport athlete at Crawford High School. He received a basketball scholarship to attend Nebraska Western Junior College, where he spent one year, before transferring to Doane College. He played golf and football as a tight end there and graduated in 1982.

Hughes served as an assistant coach at Doane, Nebraska, Wisconsin–Whitewater, Cameron, and Dartmouth. In 2000, he was hired as the head coach at Princeton University. Hughes' best season came in 2006, when the Tigers finished with a 9–1 mark to share the Ivy League co-championship with Yale. In the preseason, Princeton had been picked to finish sixth (of eight) in the conference, and the team's performance earned Hughes consideration as a finalist for the Eddie Robinson Award, which is given to the best head coach at the Division I Football Championship Subdivision level.

Princeton finished the 2009 season with a 4–6 record for the third consecutive  year. Hughes was fired the following day on November 23. At the time of his termination, Hughes had the sixth-worst record by winning percentage of the school's 21 coaches. In 2010, former Boston College coach Jeff Jagodzinski hired Hughes to be the wide receivers coach for the Omaha Nighthawks of the UFL.

Head coaching record

References

External links
 Stetson profile

1960 births
Living people
Cameron Aggies football coaches
Doane Tigers football coaches
Doane Tigers football players
Dartmouth Big Green football coaches
Omaha Nighthawks coaches
Nebraska Cornhuskers football coaches
Princeton Tigers football coaches
Stetson Hatters football coaches
Wisconsin–Whitewater Warhawks football coaches
People from Crawford, Nebraska
Coaches of American football from Nebraska
Players of American football from Nebraska